The following is a list of homonymous states and regions.

National entities and subnational entities 
This is a list of national entities bearing the same or similar names as subnational entities. For a general list of divided regions bearing the same or similar names, see Divided regions.

Armenia (country) and Armenia (city in Colombia)
Azerbaijan (country) and Azerbaijan (historical region of Iran)
Bihar, a state of India and Bihar, a former county of Hungary
 Congo (country, capital Kinshasa) and Congo (country, capital Brazzaville)
China (country, capital Taipei) and China (country, capital Beijing)
 Georgia (country) and Georgia (state of the United States)
 Guatemala (country) and Guatemala (department of Guatemala)
 Luxembourg (country) and Luxembourg (province of Belgium)
 Moldova (country) and Moldova (historical region of Romania)

Subnational entities 
This is a list of subnational entities that bear the same or similar names. For a list of divided subnational entities, see Divided regions.

 Baden (historical territory of Germany) and Baden (district of Switzerland)
 Galicia (autonomous community of Spain), Galicia (historical province of Poland) and Galicia (historical province of Ukraine)
 Iberia (peninsula in Europe divided between Spain, Portugal, Andorra and Gibraltar of Britain) and Iberia (former kingdom in Asia, mainly in Georgia)
 Karelia (federation subject of Russia) and Karelia (historical province of Finland)
 Laponia (province of Sweden) and Laponia (historical province of Finland)
 Montana (state of the United States) and Montana (capital of Montana Province in Bulgaria) 
 Munster (province of Ireland) and Münster (city in Germany)
 New Britain (island of Papua New Guinea) and New Britain (historical area of Canada)
 New Caledonia (archipelago in the Oceania, special collectivity of France) and New Caledonia (former colony in British Columbia, Canada)
 Paraná (state of Brazil) and Paraná (city in Argentina)

Ancient regions 
This is a list of ancient regions that bear the same or similar names. For a list of formerly divided regions, see Formerly divided regions.

 Belgica was originally one of the Latin names of the Netherlands and the French Belgique was used as a translation of the same country's name. However, after the Southern Netherlands became independent as Belgium, it became common to refer to - the Netherlands in French as Pays-Bas instead.
 Galatia (in Asia and Europe)
 Palestine (region) and the State of Palestine

See also 
 Albania (placename)
 Dardania

Homonym
Homonym